Tanner '88 is a political mockumentary miniseries written by Garry Trudeau and directed by Robert Altman.  First broadcast by HBO during the months leading up to the 1988 U.S. presidential election, it purports to tell the behind-the-scenes story of the campaign of former Michigan U.S. representative Jack Tanner during his bid to secure the Democratic Party's nomination for president of the United States.

The story is told from a number of different points of view, including Tanner, his campaign staff, the small army of news reporters that constantly follow the candidate, and volunteers. Many political figures of the time appear (some in cameos, some extended), including Bruce Babbitt, Bob Dole, Kitty Dukakis, Gary Hart, Jesse Jackson, and Pat Robertson. Trudeau and Altman revisited the story 16 years later in Tanner on Tanner.

Plot summary
Representative Jack Tanner of Michigan (Michael Murphy) is an obscure liberal Democratic politician who struggles to find a voice in the early 1988 Democratic primaries. His campaign manager, T.J. Cavanaugh (Pamela Reed), uses an unscripted, impassioned hotel-room speech caught on camera as part of an advertising campaign focusing on Tanner's authenticity and integrity. Using the slogan "For Real", Tanner emerges from a wide field of contenders to battle for the nomination against two high-profile and better-funded candidates: Jesse Jackson and eventual nominee Massachusetts Governor Michael Dukakis.

With Tanner are his college-aged daughter Alexandra (Cynthia Nixon), whose illness was why he earlier left politics and who has left college for the duration of the campaign, and his girlfriend Joanna Buckley (Wendy Crewson), Dukakis' deputy campaign manager. Others who appear on camera are Emile Berkoff (Jim Fyfe), a compulsive statistician with a crush on Alexandra; Deke Conners (Matt Malloy), an East Village filmmaker hired to produce Tanner campaign ads; and Andrea Spinelli (Ilana Levine), T.J.'s innocent and ditzy but well-meaning assistant. The candidate's father, General John Tanner (E.G. Marshall), who has a contentious relationship with his son, also occasionally appears.

Although Tanner does not win the nomination, he does run a serious and credible race. The series ends on a cliffhanger after Dukakis officially becomes the Democratic candidate and Tanner considers a third party run.

Cabinet
Several members of Tanner's prospective cabinet are mentioned, with several making statements to the press accepting the appointment should he become president. Those mentioned include:

 Lee H. Hamilton, prospective Secretary of State (on screen cameo)
 Lee Iacocca, prospective Secretary of Defense
 Ralph Nader, prospective Attorney General (on screen cameo)
 Robert Redford, prospective Secretary of the Interior
 Jim Hightower, prospective Secretary of Agriculture
 Studs Terkel, prospective Secretary of Labor (on screen cameo)
 Gloria Steinem, prospective Secretary of Health and Human Services (on screen cameo)
 Joan Claybrook, prospective Secretary of Transportation
 Nicholas von Hoffman, prospective Chairman of the Federal Reserve
 Barbara Jordan, prospective Ambassador to the United Nations
 Art Buchwald, prospective Ambassador to France (on screen cameo)

Episodes

Home media

The miniseries was produced and first broadcast on Home Box Office, scheduled irregularly over the real-life seven-month campaigning period from February through August 1988.

In 2004, the Sundance Channel rebroadcast the series, adding new one- to two-minute preludes created by Trudeau and Altman to each episode "in which the actors reflect, in character, on the '88 campaign from the perspective of the present day". That October, Sundance produced a four episode sequel, Tanner on Tanner. In 2020, Tanner '88 was added to HBO Max.

Production
The hybrid of fiction and reality that came to be the miniseries' trademark was initially accidental. Trudeau described the concept behind the miniseries as wanting to "let the audience feel they're eavesdropping, to create a sense of authenticity by observing the process, to follow campaign culture in all its tribal rites—not to make a topical movie about 1988." Tanner evolved during production, becoming, as Altman put it, "two-thirds scripted and one-third found art". Trudeau and Altman intended to make more episodes, but HBO did not extend the run of the series.

Reception and influence
Reviews for the miniseries seem to improve over time. In one of the earliest reviews of the pilot episode, The New York Times called the show an "interesting misfire" that "insists too much on its own sophistication about politics". The same paper held the second episode in higher esteem, calling it "humorous cinéma vérité" that's "slick and occasionally witty". In its "Best of 1988" look at television, Time magazine called it: "the year's definitive satire of media politics".

In a 2003 review of K Street, the New York Daily News said "Tanner skewer[s] brilliantly the insanity and inanity of presidential politics". By 2004, Slate was saying:

While the two shows are stylistically very different, Aaron Sorkin has acknowledged that Tanner had an influence on The West Wing, which he created over a decade later, in its underlying idealism and in its view of political staffers as people who at least struggle to do the right thing.

In 2004, Altman said "I think it's the most creative work I've ever done."

In 2019, Murphy appeared as Jack Tanner in the documentary, Rolling Thunder Revue: A Bob Dylan Story by Martin Scorsese.

Awards
Altman won a Primetime Emmy Award for Outstanding Directing in a Drama Series for the episode "The Boiler Room". Reed won an ACE Award for Best Actress in a Dramatic Series.

References

External links

Tanner ’88: Robert Altman's Best, For Real an essay by Michael Wilmington at the Criterion Collection

1988 American television series debuts
1988 American television series endings
1980s American satirical television series
English-language television shows
HBO original programming
Films directed by Robert Altman
1980s American political comedy television series
1980s American television miniseries
American mockumentary television series
1988 United States presidential election
1988 United States Democratic presidential primaries
United States presidential nominating conventions in fiction
Films about elections
Political mockumentaries
Television shows set in New Hampshire